Lane Caffaro (born March 5, 1984) is a Canadian former professional ice hockey defenceman who last played for the Hannover Indians in the German 2nd Bundesliga.

Prior to turning professional, Caffaro attended the Union College where he played four seasons with the Union Dutchmen men's ice hockey team which competes in NCAA's Division I in the ECAC Hockey conference. In his senior year (2008–09) Caffaro was named to the All-ECAC Hockey First-Team.

Awards and honours

References

External links 

1984 births
Canadian ice hockey defencemen
Hannover Indians players
Idaho Steelheads (ECHL) players
Living people
Ontario Reign (ECHL) players
Union Dutchmen ice hockey players
Wheeling Nailers players
Wilkes-Barre/Scranton Penguins players